Written in Blood is the debut album by Darkness Divided, released on August 19, 2014, through Victory Records. The album contains 11 tracks, three of which are instrumental.

Track listing

Personnel 
Darkness Divided
Gerard Mora – lead unclean vocals
Christopher Mora – lead guitar, backing unclean vocals
Sebastian Elizondo – rhythm guitar, clean vocals
Joseph Mora – bass guitar
Israel Hernandez – drums
Cory Brunnenman – additional vocals, additional song arrangement, guitar, and bass writing performance

Production
Cory Brunnemann – producer, mixer, engineer
Alan Douches – master
Ali-Lander Shindler – art direction
Sam Kaufman – artwork

References

2014 debut albums
Darkness Divided albums
Victory Records albums